Velvet Lined Shell is a mini-album by the British singer Toyah Willcox, released in 2003 by her independent label Vertical Species.

Background
This release consists of six tracks, recorded in Toyah's hometown of Birmingham. Three of the musicians on this album, Anthony Bishop, Tim Elsenburg and Alistair Hamer, are members of the experimental rock band Sweet Billy Pilgrim. The material has a deliberately raw feel to it, and what Willcox described as a "darker direction". The singer named the likes of Nick Cave, Garbage, Mogwai and Marilyn Manson amongst her newer influences. Three tracks on this album had first appeared on the 2002 EP Little Tears of Love, which was sold exclusively via Willcox's website, and strictly limited to 1000 signed copies. One track from that EP, the Tim Elsenburg composition "Experience", does not feature on this album.

Velvet Lined Shell was included in the Toyah Solo CD box set in February 2020. The following month, it was reissued on purple 10" vinyl.

Track listing
All tracks written by Toyah Willcox and Tim Elsenburg.

 "Every Scar Has a Silver Lining" – 3:25
 "Velvet Lined Shell" – 4:14
 "Little Tears of Love" – 3:23
 "You're a Miracle" – 3:00
 "Mother" – 4:20
 "Troublesome Thing" – 4:21

Personnel
 Toyah Willcox – vocals, producer
 Tim Elsenburg – guitars and backing vocals, producer, mixing
 Jon Cotton – keyboards, producer, mixing
 Anthony Bishop – bass guitar and backing vocals
 Alistair Hamer – drums
 David Singleton – mastering

References

External links
 Official audio stream on YouTube
 The official Toyah website

2003 albums
Toyah Willcox albums